North Lancashire Division 2 was an English Rugby Union league for teams from North Lancashire. The division was initially known as North-West East 2 when it was created in 1987, and had a number of different names since with North Lancashire 2 being the longest running.  Promotion from this division was into North Lancashire 1 but there was no relegation as this is the basement division of club rugby union in North Lancashire. This league, and the three other lowest level north west leagues, were replaced in 2015 by three county-specific leagues - Cheshire (South), Merseyside (West) and Lancashire (North).

Participating Clubs 2014-15
Bury
Carnforth
Clitheroe
Colne & Nelson
Crosby St Mary's
Eagle
Hutton (relegated from North Lancashire 1)
Mossley Hill (relegated from North Lancashire 1)
Newton-le-Willows
Old Bedians
Pendle

Participating Clubs 2013-14
Birchfield
Broughton
Bury (relegated from North Lancashire 1)
Carnforth	
Clitheroe	
Colne & Nelson	
Crosby St Mary's
Eagle
Newton-le-Willows
North Manchester (relegated from North Lancashire 1)
Old Bedians
Pendle

Participating Clubs 2012-13
Ashton-under-Lyne
Birchfield
Carnforth
Chorley
Clitheroe
Colne & Nelson
Crosby St Mary's
Eagle
Newton-le-Willows
Old Bedians
Pendle
Thornton Cleveleys

Original teams
When league rugby began in 1987 this division contained the following teams based in Cheshire, Greater Manchester and Lancashire:

Bolton
Broughton
Bury
Chorley
Crewe & Nantwich
Dunkinfield
Greater Manchester Fire Service
Manchester YMCA 
Marple
Oldham College

North Lancashire 2 honours

North-West East 2 (1987–1992)

The original incarnation of North Lancashire 2 was known as North-West East 2, and was a tier 11 league with promotion up to North-West East 2.  Initially, there was no relegation until the creation of North-West East 3 for the 1989–90 season.

Lancashire North 2 (1992–1996)

North-West East 2 was renamed as Lancashire North 2 for the start of the 1992–93 season with promotion to Lancashire North 1 (formerly North-West East 1), while the cancellation of North-West East 3 meant there was no longer relegation.  Initially a tier 11 league, the creation of National 5 North for the 1993–94 season saw Lancashire North 2 become a tier 12 league.

North Lancashire 2 (1996–2000)

The league system was restructured from top to bottom by the Rugby Football Union for the start of the 1996–97 season.  Lancashire North 2 was renamed as North Lancashire 2, and the cancellation of National 5 North and creation of North West 3 meant that it remained a tier 12 league.  Promotion continued to North Lancashire 1 (formerly Lancashire North 1).

North Lancashire 2 (2000–2015)

Northern league restructuring by the RFU at the end of the 1999–00 season saw the cancellation of North West 1, North West 2 and North West 3 (tiers 7-9).  This meant that North Lancashire 2 became a tier 8 league, with promotion continuing to North Lancashire 1.  North Lancashire 2 was cancelled at the end of the 2014–15 season as part of restructuring by the RFU who decided to break up the North Lancashire and South Lancs/Cheshire leagues into 3 different zones - Cheshire (South), Lancashire (North) and Merseyside (West).

Number of league titles

Ashton-under-Lyne (4)
Old Bedians (2)
Birchfield (1)
Bolton (1)
Broughton (1)
Burnage (1)
Calder Vale (1)
Clitheroe (1)
Colne & Nelson (1)
Didsbury Toc H (1)
Eccles (1)
Furness (1)
Fylde Saracens (1)
Heaton Moor (1)
Manchester Medics (1)
Marple (1)
North Manchester (1)
Oldham (1)
Pendle (1)
St. Edward's Old Boys (1)
Tarleton (1)
West Park Warriors (1)
Windermere (1)

Notes

See also
North Lancashire 1
Lancashire RFU
English Rugby Union Leagues
English rugby union system
Rugby union in England

References

9
Rugby union in Lancashire